Arcos de Zapopan is the eighteenth station of Line 3 of the light rail of Guadalajara from south-east to north-west, and the first in the opposite direction. This station is the north-west terminal of the line, as well as the first elevated station of the Guadalajara-Zapopan viaduct.

This station is located on the crossing of Juan Gil Preciado Av. (Road to Tesistán) with Arco del Triunfo Av. from the Colonia Arcos de Zapopan. When Line 3 was under construction, this station was named Periférico Tesistán, but it was changed by popular request of by local residents, since the next station (Periférico Belenes) is closer to the peripheral roadway than the terminal station. Its logotype is a cob, which represents that there were large corn crops around the place, crops that started disappearing with the growth of the city. The station serves the nearby Our Lady of Altagracia Parish.

Points of interest 
 La Cima Mall.
 Preparatory Nº. 7 of U. de G. in the Colonia Tuzanía.
 Parish of Nuestra Señora Caridad del Cobre.
 Arcos de Zapopan INE module.
 Parish La Divina Providencia in Arcos de Zapopan.
 La Estrella park.

Gallery

References 

Guadalajara light rail system Line 3 stations
Railway stations in Zapopan
Railway stations opened in 2020